"Say Na Na Na" is a 2019 single by Turkish singer Serhat. The song was released on 7 March 2019. It finished 19th in the Grand Final of the Eurovision Song Contest 2019.

Background 
Using his inner feelings, he wrote a song in five minutes. The station accepted the song.

The lyrics speak of cheering up a sad person, saying to look past dark times and to focus on good things.

Music video 
A music video was released for the song on the same day of the song's release.

Eurovision Song Contest

Selection 
After initially exploring the use of 1in360 for a second year, San Marino ultimately opted to return to an internal selection process. On 21 January 2019,  (SMRTV) held a press conference where they announced that Serhat was internally selected to represent San Marino in the Eurovision Song Contest 2019.

At Eurovision 
According to Eurovision rules, all nations with the exceptions of the host country and the "Big Five" (France, Germany, Italy, Spain and the United Kingdom) are required to qualify from one of two semi-finals in order to compete for the final; the top ten countries from each semi-final progress to the final. The European Broadcasting Union (EBU) split up the competing countries into six different pots based on voting patterns from previous contests, with countries with favourable voting histories put into the same pot. On 28 January 2019, a special allocation draw was held which placed each country into one of the two semi-finals, as well as which half of the show they would perform in. San Marino was placed into the first semi-final, to be held on 14 May 2019, and was scheduled to perform in the last spot (17th) of the second half of the show. Serhat was one of the 10 qualifiers in the first semi final, making him only the second entrant from San Marino to qualify after Valentina Monetta in 2014.

Track listing

Covers 
Serhat would release two versions of the song, in German and Spanish. In 2019, he would release a German version of the song called "Sing Na Na Na". In 2020, Serhat would release a Spanish version of the song, called "Di Na Na Na".

References 

Eurovision songs of 2019
Eurovision songs of San Marino
Serhat (singer) songs
Songs with lyrics by Mary Susan Applegate
2019 songs
2019 singles